Lachhmangarh Assembly constituency is one of constituencies of Rajasthan Legislative Assembly in the Sikar (Lok Sabha constituency).

Lachhmangarh Constituency covers all voters from Lachhmangarh tehsil.

Members of Legislative Assembly

See also 
 Member of the Legislative Assembly (India)

References

Sikar district
Assembly constituencies of Rajasthan